William Vassar Figge (March 25, 1919 – May 1976) was an American photographer who, along with his wife Melba, ran a photography studio in Glendale, California.

Biography
Figge was a combat photographer in World War II. After the war, he failed to find work as a cinematographer, so he stayed with photography and specialised in portraiture, shooting weddings and contributing to Playboy magazine. Notably, he discovered many Playmates at weddings. Bill Figge, as he is sometimes called, shot 48 gatefolds and 3 covers. The couple ceased contributing to Playboy when the magazine became more risqué in the 1980s.

Bill and Melba had three sons, (Greg, Stephan and Eric,) and one daughter (Leslie). Greg and Leslie run the studio that their parents began, Figge Studios. Eric, the only child to have formal education in photography, photographs architecture professionally.

Figge died in Glendale, California, at the age of 57.

Playboy centerfolds
April 1965 - Sue Williams
May 1965 - Maria McBane
October 1965 - Allison Parks
1966 Playmate of Year - Allison Parks
June 1966 - Kelly Burke
July 1966 - Tish Howard
November 1966 - Lisa Baker
July 1967 - Heather Ryan
1967 Playmate of Year - Lisa Baker
November 1967 - Kaya Christian
December 1967 - Lynn Winchell
February 1968 - Nancy Harwood
March 1968 - Michelle Hamilton
April 1968 - Gaye Rennie
September 1968 - Dru Hart
February 1969 - Lorrie Menconi
April 1969 - Lorna Hopper
July 1969 - Nancy McNeil
January 1970 - Jill Taylor
March 1970 - Chris Koren
June 1970 - Elaine Morton
August 1970 - Sharon Olivia Clark
1971 Playmate of Year - Sharon Olivia Clark
June 1972 - Debbie Davis
August 1972 - Linda Summers
March 1973 - Bonnie Large
August 1973 - Phyllis Coleman
October 1973 - Valerie Lane
March 1974 - Pamela Zinszer
September 1975 - Mesina Miller
May 1979 - Michele Drake

References

External links

1919 births
1976 deaths
20th-century American photographers
American military personnel of World War II